A.K.S. Vijayan (born 15 December 1961) is an Indian Politician and a former Member of Parliament of India. He was elected from the Nagapattinam constituency of Tamil Nadu as a member of the Dravida Munnetra Kazhagam (DMK) political party three times in 1999,2004 and 2009 respectively.

He was selected for 13th, 14th And 15th Lok Sabha also and has led the DMK MPs in Lok sabha. He got appointed as Tamil Nadu Government Special Representative to Delhi in June 2021.

References

External links
 Members of Fourteenth Lok Sabha - Parliament of India website
Member of Fifteenth Lok Sabha - Parliament of India website

https://loksabh

AKS Vijayan photo

1961 births
Living people
Indian Tamil people
India MPs 2004–2009
India MPs 2009–2014
Dravida Munnetra Kazhagam politicians
India MPs 1999–2004
Lok Sabha members from Tamil Nadu
People from Tiruvarur district
People from Nagapattinam district